Hopetoun House is a country house near South Queensferry owned by the Hopetoun House Preservation Trust, a charity established in 1974 to preserve the house and grounds as a national monument, to protect and improve their amenities, and to preserve the furniture, paintings, manuscripts, and other articles of historical interest associated with the house. The south wing of the house is occupied by the family of Adrian Hope, 4th Marquess of Linlithgow. The house is a Category A listed building and the grounds are included in the Inventory of Gardens and Designed Landscapes in Scotland.

History

Architecture
The house was built 1699–1701 and designed by Sir William Bruce with Bruce's master mason Tobias Bauchop in charge of the construction and working drawings (aided by his apprentice Alexander Edward). The house was then hugely extended from 1721 by William Adam until his death in 1748, being one of his most notable projects. The interior was completed by his sons John Adam and Robert Adam. The magnificent entrance hall dates from 1752.

The Hope family acquired the land in the 17th century and operated lead mines. Charles Hope, the first occupant, was only 16 years old when his mother, Lady Margaret Hope, signed the contract for building with William Bruce, on 28 September 1698. The master mason is noted as Tobias Bachope of Alloa. The plumber and glazier was John Forster of Berwick.

The house was the site of the departure of the visit of King George IV to Scotland on 29 August 1822 and the knighthood of Captain Adam Ferguson and Henry Raeburn.

Garden park

The English garden style landscape park in which it lies were laid out in 1725, also by William Adam. The east front centres on the distant isle of Inchgarvie and North Berwick Law. The walled garden dates from the late 18th century. In the grounds an 18th-century mound was excavated in 1963 to reveal the remains of the earlier manor house, Abercorn Castle, dating from the 15th century.

Preservation
In 1974, Charles William Frederick Hope, 3rd Marquess of Linlithgow created The Hopetoun House Preservation Trust to ensure Hopetoun House and the estate were preserved for future generations.

Access
During the summer months, parts of the castle and gardens are open to visitors. Classical musical recitals are occasionally put on at Hopetoun House. Chilean pianist Alfredo Perl once performed recitals of Chopin at the house.  The site can also be let for weddings, conferences, and filming.

In popular culture 

First seen as the Duke of Sandringham's home, Hopetoun House has been used in seasons 1, 2 and 3 of Outlander,  to recreate scenes in Scotland, England and Paris.

In 2020, some scenes for the ITV drama series Belgravia were filmed at the castle.

In the 2020 film The Princess Switch: Switched Again, Hopetoun House was used for the exterior of the fictional Montenaro Royal Palace.

References

Further reading
 Countess of Hopetoun, Polly Feversham and Leo Schmidt (editors), Hopetoun, Scotland's Finest Stately Home (Hirmer Verlag GmbH, Munich, 2020) .

External links

 Hopetoun House
 Gazetteer of Scotland

Scottish gardens in the English Landscape Garden style
Inventory of Gardens and Designed Landscapes
Listed houses in Scotland
William Adam buildings
William Bruce buildings